Shane Peacock (born July 7, 1973) is a Canadian professional ice hockey defenseman. He was drafted in the third round, 60th overall, by the Pittsburgh Penguins in the 1991 NHL Entry Draft.

Career
Peacock started his career with the Lethbridge Hurricanes of the Western Hockey League. After two seasons with the Hurricanes, the Penguins chose to draft Peacock in the 3rd round of the 1991 NHL Entry Draft, 60th overall. Peacock would remain with the Hurricanes for three more seasons, leading all WHL defensemen in scoring during the 1992–93 and 1993-94 WHL seasons.

Peacock would start his professional career with the Kalamazoo Wings (later Michigan K-Wings) of the International Hockey League. He would leave the K-Wings after the 1996-97 IHL season and continue his career in Germany. Peacock was a member of the München Barons, who won the DEL championship in 1999-2000, and has captained the Nürnberg Ice Tigers since 2009.

Career statistics

Awards
1999-00 DEL Champion, München Barons
2000-01 DEL All-Star
2000-01 DEL Best Defenseman, The Hockey News

References

External links

1973 births
Living people
Canadian ice hockey defencemen
Düsseldorfer EG players
Ice hockey people from Edmonton
Frankfurt Lions players
Hamburg Freezers players
Kalamazoo Wings (1974–2000) players
Kassel Huskies players
Kölner Haie players
Lethbridge Hurricanes players
München Barons players
Nürnberg Ice Tigers players
Pittsburgh Penguins draft picks